William VI (1004 – March 1038), called the Fat, was Duke of Aquitaine and Count of Poitou (as William IV) between 1030 and his death. He was the eldest son of William V the Great by his first wife, Adalmode of Limoges.

Throughout his reign, he had to face the hostility of his stepmother, Agnes of Burgundy, the third wife of his father, who had remarried to Geoffrey Martel, then count of Vendôme. He entered into a war with Martel, who pretended to the government of the Saintonge. On 20 September 1034, he was captured in the field at Moncontour, near Saint-Jouin-de-Marnes. He was freed in 1036, after nearly three years imprisonment, only by ceding the cities of Saintes and Bordeaux. He immediately reopened the war, but was defeated again and had to cede the isle of Oléron.

William married Eustachie of Montreuil but had no known descendants. He reformed the administration of Poitiers by naming a provost, and died there, being succeeded by his half-brother Odo. He was buried at Maillezais.

See also
Dukes of Aquitaine family tree

Notes

Sources

William 06 of Aquitaine
Counts of Poitiers
Burials at Maillezais Abbey
1004 births
1038 deaths